Jay Jensen may refer to:
 Jay Jensen (athletic trainer)
 Jay E. Jensen (born 1942), general authority of the Church of Jesus Christ of Latter-day Saints
 Jay W. Jensen (1931–2007), American drama teacher